War Flowers is a 2012 American war film written and directed by Serge Rodnunsky and starring Jason Gedrick, Christina Ricci, and Tom Berenger.   It is the first feature film having been produced by Unity Studios.

Plot
War Flowers is an American Civil War tale about a woman in North Carolina named Sarabeth Ellis whose husband has been called up for military service by the Confederate States of America. While she and her little daughter Melody suffer with food shortage, they also are threatened by a creepy neighbor who has avoided military service.

After a skirmish between Union and Confederate soldiers right outside their farmhouse, they discover a gravely wounded Union soldier named Louis who seems to be dying in their cellar. Together with her daughter, Sarabeth decides to nurse him back to health and even hides him when several renegade soldiers of the Confederacy check the house.

Sarabeth and Louis develop romantic feelings, but do not seem to act on their attraction because Sarabeth is married. Once Louis has sufficiently recovered, Sarabeth tries to ensure he is taken back to the Union lines with the help of two escaping slaves. However, before they leave the farmhouse, there is one more violent confrontation with the evil neighbor.

The final section of the film includes a dream-like sequences in which Sarabeth's husband seems to make a final visit to the farm, even though it is clear that he already has fallen in battle. The movie shows the war's final days with a catastrophic attack at the farm that burns the family home to its foundations. Sarabeth and her daughter appear close to starvation. Finally, Louis is able to return for a reunion. Sarabeth revives and talks about her hope for a new world of peace. "We're going to look towards tomorrow and a new life," she tells Sarabeth and Louis. Together, they walk down the road away from the farm.

Cast
 Christina Ricci as Sarabeth Ellis 
 Jason Gedrick as Louis McIntire
 Tom Berenger as Gen. McIntire
 Gabrielle Popa as Melody Ellis
 Bren Foster as John Ellis

Reception
The Dove Foundation awarded the film their seal "Family-Approved" and considered it "well worth your viewing time".

References

External links
 Official homepage
 
 
 

American Civil War films
Films set in North Carolina
Films set in the 1860s
Films set in the 19th century
2010s English-language films
2010s American films